Scott Marshall Rauland is an American diplomat.

He received his B.A. in European history from the University of Chicago in 1981 and his M.A. in Russian language and literature from Ohio State University in 1986. From 1982 through 1984 he studied at the University of Mainz, Germany.

Biography

Education 
After graduation from university, he taught English in Wiesbaden, Germany, in the 1980s and Russian in Wisconsin from 1990 to 1993.

Career 
Since 1993, he has been working in the U.S. Foreign Service. His first post there was Assistant Public Affairs Officer at Baku, Azerbaijan. From 1995 through 1998 he worked in Berlin as Program Development Officer for the new German Eastern states. Then, he took over the post Information Center Director in Islamabad, Pakistan for two years, before he was called to the American embassy in Quito, Ecuador, where he eventually took over the Public Affairs Division. From 2003 through 2005, he served as Consul General in Yekaterinburg, Russia, before returning to Germany to work in Frankfurt as Public Affairs Officer of the U.S. Consulate General. From late 2007 on, he worked in Afghanistan. He served as the U.S. Chargé d'affaires to Belarus at the American Embassy in Minsk from June 2014 to July 2016, followed by an assignment at the U.S. Helsinki Commission from August 2016 through December 2018, where he worked on human rights and security issues in Russia, Belarus, and the Baltics.

See also

List of ambassadors of the United States

References 

Living people
Ohio State University Graduate School alumni
Johannes Gutenberg University Mainz alumni
University of Chicago alumni
Year of birth missing (living people)
Ambassadors of the United States to Belarus